Châteaurenault has been the name of a number of ships of the French Navy, in honour of François Louis de Rousselet, Marquis de Châteaurenault:
  - second-class cruiser, present at Battle of Fuzhou (1884)
 , a protected cruiser

French Navy ship names